James Henry (born March 11, 1991) is a Canadian former ice hockey left winger who currently serves as the head coach of the Reading Royals of the ECHL. He previously served as the captain for the Adirondack Thunder of the ECHL.

Playing career

Junior
Henry was selected into the Western Hockey League (WHL) 187th overall by the Vancouver Giants in the 2006 WHL Bantam Draft. He began his major junior career with the Giants in 2007-08, recording 15 points in 46 games played. That same year, he was selected by Canada Western U17 (WHC-17), recording 3 points and winning a bronze medal. He finished his career in Vancouver as the Giants' Captain in 2012 before being traded to the Moose Jaw Warriors of the WHL, where he recorded 30 points in 28 games played. Currently, Henry is the Vancouver Giants' single season short-handed goals leader with 6 (from the 2009-10 campaign), ranks 5th in games played with 281 (2006–12), and ranks 5th in penalty minutes with 57 (2006–12). Notably, on March 20, 2010, the Giants and Kamloops Blazers combined for the fastest three goals in WHL playoff history. Craig Cunningham scored at 3:58 of the 3rd period for Vancouver, James Henry scored at 4:14 for Vancouver, and Dalibor Bortnak scored at 4:21 for Kamloops. The Giants won 6-3.

He had a short stint with the University of Manitoba of the CIS in 2012-13 (Canadian Interuniversity Sport), where he was awarded the CIS (West) Most Outstanding Freshman (University of Alberta Hockey Alumni Trophy) and was named to the CIS All-Rookie Team.

Professional
Henry spent two seasons with the Stockton Thunder of the ECHL (2013–15); Henry followed the organization when it moved to Glens Falls, NY, for the 2016 season. Henry played for the Adirondack Thunder of the ECHL for 5 seasons, serving as the team's Captain from 2018–20, where he is the franchise's all-time points, assists, games played, single-season assists, and single-season points leader. Henry was invited to the 2016-17 ECHL All-Star Game and received the ECHL Community Service Award 2018-19.

In April 2022, Henry was inducted into the Adirondack Hockey Hall of Fame's 2022 Class alongside Claude Loiselle, and Mike Kane.

Coaching career
In the summer of 2021, Henry was named as the first head coach of the Binghamton Black Bears of the Federal Professional Hockey League before resigning to accept a position as the Reading Royals assistant coach.

Henry served as the Reading Royals assistant coach under head coach Kirk Macdonald 2021–22. In 2022, MacDonald left his position and Henry was promoted to the head coach and director of hockey operations for the 2022–23 season.

Personal
Henry and his wife, Ashley, live in the Reading, PA area with their child, Tillie.

References

External links
 

1991 births
Living people
Adirondack Thunder players
Canadian ice hockey players
Manitoba Bisons ice hockey players
Moose Jaw Warriors players
Reading Royals players
Ice hockey people from Winnipeg
Stockton Thunder players
Vancouver Giants players